Tamazi Vakhtangovich Yenik (born 15 January 1967) is a Russian football coach and a former player. He manages FC Gagra.

References

1967 births
Living people
Soviet footballers
FC Dinamo Sukhumi players
Russian footballers
FC Lokomotiv Nizhny Novgorod players
Russian Premier League players
FC Torpedo NN Nizhny Novgorod players
FC Spartak-UGP Anapa players
Russian football managers
Association football defenders